Brian Tink (born 26 September 1958) is an Australian former boxer. He competed in the men's bantamweight event at the 1976 Summer Olympics. At the 1976 Summer Olympics, he defeated Glubran Zugdani of Liberia, before losing to Bernardo Onori of Italy.

He won the bronze medal in the Men's Lightweight at the 1982 Commonwealth Games.

References

External links
 

1958 births
Living people
Australian male boxers
Olympic boxers of Australia
Boxers at the 1976 Summer Olympics
People from Dubbo
Commonwealth Games medallists in boxing
Commonwealth Games bronze medallists for Australia
Boxers at the 1982 Commonwealth Games
Bantamweight boxers
Sportsmen from New South Wales
Medallists at the 1982 Commonwealth Games